General elections were held in Liechtenstein on 3 February 2013, using a proportional representation system. Four parties contested the elections; the centre-right Patriotic Union (VU) and Progressive Citizens' Party (FBP), centre-left Free List (FL) and newly created populist alliance The Independents (DU).

Background
The previous elections in 2009 were won by the Patriotic Union which managed to secure an absolute majority of the seats (13 out of 25). Despite winning a parliamentary majority, the Patriotic Union chose to form a coalition with the conservative Progressive Citizens' Party, which won 11 seats.  The Free List won a single seat and became the opposition party.

Prime Minister Klaus Tschuetscher's term in office was marked by an effort to move the country away from being a tax haven. Prior to the election Tschuetscher, who is a member of the Patriotic Union (VU) party, declared he would not be seeking the premiership for a second term.

Electoral system
The 25 members of the Landtag were elected by open list proportional representation from two constituencies, Oberland with 15 seats and Unterland with 10 seats. Only parties and lists with more than 8% of the votes cast in each constituency were eligible to win seats in the Landtag.

The constituency of Unterland consists of the municipalities of Eschen, Gamprin, Mauren, Ruggell and Schellenberg. The other constituency, Oberland, consists of the municipalities of Balzers, Planken, Schaan, Triesen, Triesenberg and Vaduz.

Opinion polls
On 28 January 2013, the newspaper Liechtensteiner Vaterland published a poll in which they asked their readers, "Which party conducted the best election campaign?" About 10,000 people responded, and the results of the poll were as follows:

Results
This was the first election in Liechtenstein in which four different political groups have won seats in the Landtag. The success of The Independents was considered by observers to be a result of protest votes against austerity measures in the country. It was also postulated that greater diversity in the Landtag was a result of a decreased partisanship of voters.

Patriotic Union members expressed their disappointment at the result. The VU suffered a large defeat, losing more than a third of its seats. The Progressive Citizens' Party lost one seat.

By electoral district

References

Liechtenstein
Elections in Liechtenstein
2013 in Liechtenstein
February 2013 events in Europe